The Zvezda Kh-66 and Kh-23 Grom ( 'Thunder';  NATO: AS-7 'Kerry') are a family  of early Soviet tactical air-to-surface missiles with a range of 10 km. They were intended for use against small ground or naval targets. The Kh-66 was effectively a heavy-warhead, beam-riding version of the K-8 (AA-3 'Anab') air-to-air missile rushed into service in Vietnam in 1968. The Kh-23 was an improved Kh-66 with command-guidance, similar to the AGM-12 Bullpup.

Development
Work on air-to-air missiles had started at the Kaliningrad Engineering Plant (then known as Plant #455, and later merged into Zvezda-Strela) in 1955. This had resulted in the Kaliningrad K-5 (AA-1 'Alkali') family of beam-guided missiles, including the K-51 (RS-2-US) carried by the Su-9 'Fishpot'. OKB-4 Molniya (later Vympel NPO) under Matus Bisnovat would go on to produce missiles such as the AA-6 Acrid. Meanwhile, in 1963 the RS-2-US was tested as an air-to-surface missile. It was concluded that the small warhead and inaccurate guidance made such an application "pointless".

However, in 1965 North Vietnam requested an air-to-surface missile from the Soviet government; the AGM-12 Bullpup had entered service with the US Air Force before the start of the Vietnam War. In April 1965 OKB-134 (later NPO Vympel) started work on this missile under the project name Kh-23, but they had problems developing a guidance system that would work with existing aircraft. As a result, Yurii N. Korolyov came up with his own proposals based on the earlier experiments with the RS-2-US.  A design bureau to develop the RS-2-US for surface targets was set up under Korolyov by decree #100 of 12 March 1966 of the Ministry of the Aircraft Industry; this bureau would become the Zvezda OKB in 1976.

This had the big advantage of allowing the new weapon to be fitted to any aircraft capable of firing the K-5. Design began in 1966, so the project was known as Kh-66 or Izdeliye 66 ('Article 66'). The Kh-66 was a beam-riding weapon that was tested on a MiG-21PFM and entered production in 1968 for that aircraft. The Kh-66 was only an interim solution as it required the launch aircraft to dive towards the target to maintain lock on the target. Flight testing of the Kh-66 began in 1967 and it entered service on 20 June 1968.

Meanwhile, Korolyov took over work on the Kh-23 project intended for carriage on the Soviet Union's new MiG-23. The Kh-23 became a development of the Kh-66 design with an improved propellant and new Delta-R1M guidance system. The main practical difference was that it was a line-of-sight radio-command weapon similar to the Bullpup, allowing it to be fired in level flight (unlike the Kh-66). The first ten were tested in early 1968, but significant delays were caused by problems with unreliable guidance which was eventually traced to the smoke generator which interfered with the antenna. Once the receiver had been moved to a tail extension, the government tested the missile on the MiG-23 and MiG-23B between 20 March 1970 and 3 October 1973. and it entered service in 1973. A laser-guided version of the Kh-23, the Kh-25, became the basis for the AS-10 'Karen' family of missiles.  Technology from these was 'backported' to the Kh-23 to create the Kh-23M in 1974.

The Kh-23 was later licensed for local production in both Romania and Yugoslavia. In 1977 a dummy Kh-23 was fired from a Ka-252TB helicopter, the prototype of the Kamov Ka-29TB 'Helix-B' assault transport.

Design
The Kh-66 used the airframe of the Kaliningrad K-8 (AA-3 'Anab') air-to-air missile, with the nozzle split to make room for the antenna of the beam-riding guidance system of the Kaliningrad K-5 (AA-1 'Alkali'). It has cruciform control fins on the nose, and four clipped-tip delta-wings at the rear with elevators for control.

Operational history
The Kh-66 entered production for the MiG-21 in 1968, and the Kh-23 was certified for the MiG-23 'Flogger' in 1973.

Variants

 Kh-66 - the original beam-riding missile based on the K-8
 Kh-23 (Izdeliye 68) - First command-guidance version with improved propellant
 Kh-23M - improved Kh-23 with technology from the Kh-25 family
 Kh-23L - Western name for a laser-guided version that in fact was the baseline Kh-25 (AS-10 'Karen')
 A921 - Version made in Romania
 Grom (Grom 02) - Yugoslav version that appeared in the 1980s. This should not be confused with the Polish SAM
 Grom-B (Grom 2) - TV-guided version from Serbia's Vojno-Tehnički Institut in the mid-late 1990s; uses seeker based on that of the AGM-65B Maverick

Operators

Former operators
 
 
 
 
 
 
  (A921)
  (Grom)
  - passed on to successor states

Similar weapons
 AGM-12 Bullpup
 AS-20 - French air-to-ground missile based on an early air-to-air missile

Notes

References
 
 

Cold War air-to-surface missiles of the Soviet Union
Kh-023
Kh-023
Vympel NPO products
Military equipment introduced in the 1960s